Jordan Morgan (born May 13, 1994) is a former American football guard. He played college football at Kutztown University of Pennsylvania. Morgan was drafted by the Chicago Bears in the fifth round of the 2017 NFL Draft.

College career
Jordan played football at Kutztown University of Pennsylvania, an NCAA Division II school. During his career, he played in 43 games and majored in leisure and sport studies.

Professional career
Morgan received an invitation to the NFL Combine and was able to complete all of the drills. After attending the combine, he was projected to be a fourth or fifth round pick by the majority or analysts and scouts. He was ranked the eighth best guard in the draft by Sports Illustrated and the ninth best guard by NFLDraftScout.com. On March 8, 2017, he decided to attend Temple's pro day,
but was satisfied with his combine performance and only executed positional drills.

Chicago Bears
Morgan was drafted by the Chicago Bears in the fifth round, 147th overall, in the 2017 NFL Draft. On May 11, 2017, the Bears signed Morgan to a four-year, $2.69 million contract with a signing bonus of $296,038. He was placed on injured reserve on September 2, 2017.

On September 1, 2018, Morgan was waived by the Bears.

Tennessee Titans
On October 10, 2018, Morgan was signed to the Tennessee Titans practice squad. He was released on December 3, 2018.

New York Jets
On February 7, 2019, Morgan was signed by the New York Jets. He was waived on August 31, 2019.

Calgary Stampeders
Morgan signed to the Calgary Stampeders' practice roster on September 30, 2019. He was released from the practice roster on October 26, 2019, and re-signed to the active roster for the 2020 season on November 26, 2019.

DC Defenders
Morgan signed with the DC Defenders of the XFL during training camp. He was waived during final roster cuts on January 22, 2020.

References

External links
Chicago Bears bio
Kutztown Golden Bears bio

1994 births
Living people
American football offensive guards
Calgary Stampeders players
Chicago Bears players
Kutztown Golden Bears football players
New York Jets players
Players of American football from Philadelphia
Tennessee Titans players
DC Defenders players